Mridula Ahmed (born 24 Feb 1987) who is known by her stage name Racy is a Bangladeshi actress, business person and television anchor. Since 2000 to present she is an enlisted artist of BTV.

Early life 
Mridula Ahmed was born 24 February 1987 at South balubari Dinajpur Sadar in Bangladesh. At the age of 8, she started learning classical dance at Noborupi Shilpo Organisation in Dinajpur. She learned folk, classical, manipuri, Bharatanatyam, and general dance. In 1995, she won second place at the national children contest at Dinajpur for Folk dance. When she was 11 she came third at Caritas Bangladesh for dance. She got the Bangladesh Shishu Academy award in 1997,1998,1999, 2000, 2001 for outstanding achievements. She got Jatio Sikkha Soptaho award several times. In 2000, she won the Bangabandhu Shishu Kishore Mela award for dance. In 1999, she achieved a testimonial certificate from Shilpokola Academy for general dance and took first place in 2000. She finished ucchango dance course there. On June 17, 2000, she was awarded a UNESCO cultural award, organised by the national association of UNESCO clubs in Bangladesh. In 2000, Racy got Sheikh Russel Jatiyo Shishu Kishore first place award for folk dance. In 2003, Racy won the Goalini Binodon Bichitra photo contest.

Career 
She did more than 15 television commercials. Racy's acting debut was in TV drama Jol Pore Pata Nore. Her first commercial film appearance was in Nil Achol. Racy did 50 commercial Bangladeshi films, including Kopal, Obuj shishu, Ar e Nam Valobasha, Chehara, Guru Vai, Amar Jan Amar Pran, Amar Buker Moddho Khane, Kajer Manush, Rikshawalar Chele, Mayer Chokh, Goriber Vai, Chotto Shongshar, Ak Joban, Amar Prithibi Tumi, Shami Vaggo, and Shunno.  Recently Racy finished shooting Yes Madam. Racy got several awards from national cultural organisations including CJFB award, Babisas award several time as a best actress. She performed many national and international stage shows.

In 2020 Racy started her Beauty salon business  at Dhaka.

Personal life 
On 22 June 2012 Racy married Md.Toufiqul Islam Pantha. They have two daughters, Radwa Islam (born 2013) and Raowa Islam (born 2016).

Filmography

Awards
 Bangladesh Shishu Academy award in 1997-2001
 Jatio Sikkha Soptaho award
 Bangabandhu Shishu Kishore Mela award
 UNESCO cultural award (2000)
 Sheikh Russel Jatiyo Shishu Kishore award (2000)
 BCRA Award (2008)
 Index Media Performance Award
 Nandan Kala Kendra Award
 Rokomari Sangbad Star Award
 CJFB award
 15th Sacco Telefilm Award (2014)
 Babisas Award (2016)
 Human Rights Peace Award (2017)
 TRUB Award (2022)

References

External links
 

Bangladeshi film actresses
Bangladeshi television actresses
Living people
Bangladeshi television presenters
Bangladeshi women television presenters
Bangladeshi businesspeople
1987 births